Mary Clubwala Jadhav MBE (1909–1975) was an Indian philanthropist.

She founded many NGOs in Chennai and across India, and is often credited with setting up the oldest organized social-work bodies in the country. Her organization Guild of Service operates more than a dozen units related to orphanages, female literacy, the care and rehabilitation of the disabled, etc.

Early life 

Mary was born in 1909 in Ootacamund in the then Madras Presidency to Rustom Patel and Allamai, member of the 300-strong Parsi community of Madras city. She was schooled in Madras and married Nogi Clubwala at the age of 18. They had a son, Khusro, in 1930. Nogi Clubwala died due to an illness in 1935. After this she devoted herself to social work. She later remarried to Major Chandrakant K Jadhav, an Indian army officer who was also working in the same areas of social work.

Activities 
In 1942, with World War II raging, Clubwala founded the Indian Hospitality Committee with helpers drawn mostly from the Guild of Service. A large number of Indian troops were stationed in and around Madras and they had very few amenities. Mrs. Clubwala persuaded women from all communities and walks of life to join in the effort to organise mobile canteens, hospital visits, diversional therapy and entertainment programmes. The public donated generously to the War Fund started by the Hospitality Committee which continued its efforts after the War by helping ex-servicemen and their families rehabilitate themselves. The victorious 14th Army presented Mary a Japanese sword in appreciation of her tremendous efforts. Mrs. Clubwala was called "the Darling of the Army" by General Cariappa.
She started Madras School of Social work in 1952, the first school of social work in South India and second in India (after Tata Institute of Social Sciences- Mumbai).

She was appointed Sheriff of Madras in succession to Mr. R. E. Castell for one year in 1956.
She also honored the Duke of Edinburgh on his visit to Madras (now Chennai) in 1961.

Awards 
Member of the Order of the British Empire (MBE) (1941 New Year Honours)
Padma Shri (1955)
Padma Bhushan (1968)
Padma Vibhushan, the second highest civilian honor of India  (1975).

References

External links 
 Guild of Service 

Politicians from Chennai
Sheriffs of Madras
Recipients of the Padma Vibhushan in social work
Recipients of the Padma Bhushan in social work
Recipients of the Padma Shri in social work
Members of the Order of the British Empire
1909 births
Women sheriffs
Social workers
1975 deaths
Parsi people
Women in Tamil Nadu politics
Indian women philanthropists
20th-century Indian politicians
People from Ooty
20th-century Indian women politicians
20th-century Indian educators
Educators from Tamil Nadu
Women educators from Tamil Nadu
Social workers from Tamil Nadu
20th-century Indian philanthropists
20th-century women educators
20th-century women philanthropists